Ralph Osborne Campney  (June 6, 1894 – October 6, 1967) was a Canadian politician.

Born in Picton, Ontario, he first ran unsuccessfully for the House of Commons of Canada in the riding of Vancouver Centre in a 1948 by-election. A Liberal, he was elected in the 1949 federal election and in 1953. He was defeated in 1957. From 1951 to 1952, he was the Parliamentary Assistant to the Minister of National Defence. From 1952 to 1954, he was the Solicitor General of Canada. From 1953 to 1954, he was also the Associate Minister of National Defence. From 1954 to 1957, he was the Minister of National Defence.

Early life and military service
Campney was born on June 6, 1894 on a farm near Picton, Ontario to Frank Campney and Mary Emily Cronk. Campney attended Picton Collegiate and graduated at 16, beginning a career as a rural school teacher. In 1914, Campney entered Queen's University at Kingston, Ontario, studying medicine.

In March 1915, Campney enlisted in the Canadian Army with No.5 Stationary Hospital (Queen's). During World War I he was deployed overseas to Egypt as part of the Dardanelles Campaign. The unit was later transferred to the Western Front where it supported Allied forces at the Battle of the Somme. In 1917, Campney was commissioned into the infantry, joining the 19th Canadian Infantry Battalion after the Battle of Vimy Ridge. He served with the unit until the Battle of Passchendaele when he was invalided to England. In England, Campney transferred to the Royal Flying Corps and remained with the unit until the Armistice.

Postwar and political career
After leaving the military, Campney returned to Queen's University in 1919 where he transferred from medicine to arts and obtained his Bachelor of Arts in 1921. Campney entered Osgoode Hall to study law and in 1924, was called to the bar. He was secretary to the Canadian delegation to the League of Nations in Geneva, Switzerland in Fall 1924. Upon his return to Canada, Campney became political secretary to William Lyon Mackenzie King from 1925-26 in Ottawa. In 1929, Campney became private secretary to the Minister of Trade and Commerce James Malcolm.

Campney left Ottawa in 1929 and moved to Vancouver, British Columbia to practice law. 1936, Campney was asked by the Canadian government to become the first chairman of the National Harbours Board, remaining in this position for three and a half years. He resigned from the position and returned to his private law practice. In 1940, Campney was appointed Dominion King's Counsel. He ran for the first time as a Liberal nominee in a federal by-election in the riding of Vancouver Centre in 1948, where he was defeated. He ran again the following year in the general election, where he was elected to the House of Commons and was re-elected in 1953. In 1950, Crampney was chair of a special parliamentary committee on the National Defence Act which unified the administration of the three military services. In January 1951, he was appointed Parliamentary Assistant to the Minister of Defence, Brooke Claxton. The following year, on October 15, 1952 he was made Solicitor General of Canada. On February 15, 1953, he was appointed Associate Minister of National Defence while keeping his duties as Solicitor General and kept these two positions until January 12, 1954 when he resigned as Solicitor General. On July 1, he succeeded Claxton as Minister of National Defence.

Election results

References
 

1894 births
1967 deaths
Liberal Party of Canada MPs
Members of the House of Commons of Canada from British Columbia
Members of the King's Privy Council for Canada
People from Prince Edward County, Ontario
Solicitors General of Canada
Canadian King's Counsel
Queen's University at Kingston alumni
Royal Flying Corps officers
Canadian Expeditionary Force officers
Canadian military personnel of World War I
Argyll and Sutherland Highlanders of Canada (Princess Louise's) officers
Canadian military personnel from Ontario